Kaarlo Niilonen (3 June 1922 – 24 February 1996) was a Finnish footballer and manager.

References
History of KooTeePee
Switzerland – Trainers of First and Second Division Clubs
Finnish Players Abroad
Hjørring AIK Frem – JYSK FODBOLDHISTORIE

People from Kotka
Finnish footballers
Finland international footballers
Finnish football managers
Expatriate football managers in Denmark
Viborg FF managers
AaB Fodbold managers
1922 births
1996 deaths
Kotkan Työväen Palloilijat players
Association footballers not categorized by position
Sportspeople from Kymenlaakso